Condorcet efficiency is a measurement of the performance of voting methods.  It is defined as the percentage of elections for which the Condorcet winner (the candidate who is preferred over all others in head-to-head races) is elected, provided there is one.

A voting method with 100% efficiency would always pick the Condorcet winner, when one exists, and a method that never chose the Condorcet winner would have 0% efficiency. The outcome of a referendum on policy can be efficient if the conditions of the efficient voter rule are met.

Efficiency is not only affected by the voting method, but is a function of the number of voters, number of candidates, and of any strategies used by the voters.

It was initially developed in 1984 by Samuel Merrill III, along with Social utility efficiency.

A related, generalized measure is Smith efficiency, which measures how often a voting method elects a candidate in the Smith set. Except in elections where the Smith set includes all candidates, Smith efficiency is a measure that can be used to differentiate between voting methods in all elections, because unlike the CW, the Smith set always exists. A 100% Smith-efficient method is guaranteed to be 100% Condorcet-efficient, and likewise with 0%.

See also 

 Social utility efficiency
 Comparison of electoral systems

References 

Voting theory
Electoral systems